Vice Jurišić (23 March 1909 – 6 August 1993) was a Croatian rower. He competed in two events at the 1936 Summer Olympics.

References

External links
 

1909 births
1993 deaths
Croatian male rowers
Olympic rowers of Yugoslavia
Rowers at the 1936 Summer Olympics
Sportspeople from Šibenik